Chumphon railway station is a railway station in Tha Taphao Subdistrict, Chumphon City, and is the main railway station for Chumphon Province. It is a class 1 railway station,  from Thon Buri railway station. It is the first fueling station from Bangkok, and thus all trains going further south must stop here. Chumphon is also the site of a locomotive depot.

On the site, there are two decommissioned locomotives:
 178 Unit No. 21810 (North British Locomotive Company)
 235 Unit No. 59441 (Baldwin Locomotive Works)

History 
Chumphon was the location where the two sides of the Southern Line construction met, one from Thon Buri, one from U-Taphao Junction (Hat Yai). This was completed on 17 September 1916, and services started running from Thon Buri to U-Taphao, stopping at Chumphon and Thung Song Junction for fueling and resting (at the time no services ran at night). In 1922, night services became available.

Chumphon was a water and wood refueling station for steam locomotives, as well as a place for reducing carriages going further south.

During the Second World War, Chumphon acted as a junction for the 90 km military line to Khao Fachi, Ranong, under the coordination of the Imperial Japanese Army. The line was built in December 1943. In March 1945, Allied bombings (using Consolidated B-24 Liberators) destroyed Chumphon station and the line to Khao Fachi. After the war, the Japanese requested the dismantling of the railway to prevent further Allied attacks on Japanese military bases.

Chumphon Station was rebuilt in 1948.

Train services 
 Special Express 43/44 Bangkok-Surat Thani-Bangkok
 Special Express 35/36 Bangkok-Padang Besar-Bangkok
 Special Express 37/38 Bangkok-Sungai Kolok-Bangkok
 Rapid 171/172 Bangkok-Sungai Kolok-Bangkok
 Rapid 169/170 Bangkok-Yala-Bangkok
 Express 83/84 Bangkok-Trang-Bangkok
 Rapid 173/174 Bangkok-Nakhon Si Thammarat-Bangkok
 Rapid 167/168 Bangkok-Kantang-Bangkok
 Express 85/86 Bangkok-Nakhon Si Thammarat-Bangkok
 Special Express 39/40 Bangkok-Surat Thani-Bangkok
 Special Express 41/42 Bangkok-Yala-Bangkok
 Ordinary 254/255 Lang Suan-Thon Buri-Lang Suan
 Rapid 177/178 Thon Buri-Lang Suan-Thon Buri
 Local 445/446 Chumphon-Hat Yai Junction-Chumphon

References 
 
 
 
 
 
 
 
 

Railway stations in Thailand